Major William Brereton Couchman Lewis, 3rd Baron Merthyr, KBE, TD, PC (7 January 1901 – 16 April 1977), styled The Honourable William Lewis between 1914 and 1932, was a British barrister and politician.

Lewis was the son of Herbert Clark Lewis, 2nd Baron Merthyr, by Elizabeth Anna Couchman (d. 1925), eldest daughter of Major-General Richard Short Couchman, of Victoria Street, London. He succeeded his father in the barony in March 1932. He served in the Second World War as a Major in the Pembroke Heavy Regiment of the British Army and was a prisoner of war in Hong Kong from 1941 to 1945. After the war Lord Merthyr served as Chairman of the Committees in the House of Lords from 1957 to 1965 and as a Deputy Speaker from 1957 to 1974. In 1964 he was admitted to the Privy Council. He was also Chairman and Vice-President of the National Marriage Guidance Council, of the Magistrates' Association and of the Family Planning Association as well as Honorary Treasurer of the National Society for the Prevention of Cruelty to Children and of the Royal Society for the Prevention of Cruelty to Animals.

Lord Merthyr married Violet Meyrick, third daughter of Brigadier-General Sir Frederick Charlton Meyrick, 2nd Baronet, in 1932. He died in April 1977, aged 76, and was succeeded by his son Trevor, who immediately disclaimed the title. Lady Merthyr died in February 2003. Lord Merthyr's fourth son the Honourable Robin Lewis has been Lord Lieutenant of Dyfed since 2006.

Arms

References

1901 births
1977 deaths
Barons in the Peerage of the United Kingdom
Knights Commander of the Order of the British Empire
Members of the Privy Council of the United Kingdom
People educated at Eton College
British Army personnel of World War II
Royal Artillery officers
National Society for the Prevention of Cruelty to Children people
British World War II prisoners of war
People educated at Sunningdale School
Alumni of Magdalen College, Oxford
English barristers